

USCGC Icarus (WPC-110) was a steel-hulled, diesel-powered Thetis-class patrol boat of the United States Coast Guard that patrolled the United States East Coast during World War II. U-352 was the second World War II U-boat sunk by the United States in American waters, and the first one from which survivors were taken.

Built by Bath Iron Works of Bath, Maine, Icarus was delivered on 29 March 1932 and commissioned on 1 April 1932. After a shakedown cruise, she reported to the New York Division's Special Patrol Force, where she supported the Coast Guard's efforts against rum-runners until Prohibition ended in 1933, continuing after that to perform general law enforcement duties and rescue patrols. In November 1941, with World War II nearly two years underway, the Coast Guard was transferred from the U.S. Treasury Department to the U.S. Navy.

Germany declared war on the U.S. on 11 December 1941, and Icarus was rearmed and assigned to the Eastern Sea Frontier for patrol duty off the East Coast. German U-boats quickly became a serious threat on the East Coast, sinking approximately 80 ships between January and April 1942, with U.S. defenses only managing to sink one U-boat during that period.

U-352 incident
While in Torpedo Alley, off the coast of Cape Lookout en route to Key West on 9 May 1942, Icarus picked up a contact on sonar, and a torpedo exploded nearby. Icarus anticipated the presumed U-boat's next move and dropped 5 depth charges at the site of the prior torpedo explosion. As sonar picked up a moving target again, Icarus moved to intercept, dropping two more depth charges, apparently hitting their target as bubbles were seen rising to the surface. Passing the spot again, Icarus dropped three more charges. Shortly thereafter,  surfaced, and Icarus opened fire with machine guns and prepared for a ramming maneuver. When the U-boat's crew abandoned ship, Icarus ceased fire, releasing one last depth charge over U-352 as it sank beneath the water.

The only U-boat previously sunk on the East Coast had gone down with all hands, and there were no standing orders concerning the rescue of survivors. Icarus had to call both Norfolk and Charleston before receiving authorization to pick up U-352s survivors. Forty minutes after the incident, Icarus picked up 33 of its crew, including U-352's commander, Kapitänleutnant Hellmut Rathke, and delivered them to the Commandant of the 6th Naval District at Charleston Navy Yard the next day.

For his actions in sinking U-352, Lieutenant Maurice D. Jester, commander of the Icarus, was awarded the Navy Cross. There were only six Coast Guard recipients of the Navy Cross during World War II.

Later service
Rearmed at Norfolk Navy Yard, Icarus resumed her duties as a convoy escort, anti-submarine patroller and search and rescue ship. She was transferred to the 3rd Naval District for duty with the Air-Sea Rescue Service in 1945. On 18 October 1946 she was placed on reserve status at Stapleton, Staten Island. Icarus was decommissioned on 15 March 1948 and sold on 1 July 1948 to the Southeastern Terminal and Steamship Company. She was later transferred to the Navy of the Dominican Republic where she was renamed Independencia (P-105, later P-204). She saw combat in the Dominican Civil War in 1965, was rebuilt in 1975, and was later sent to reserve. Independencia was still listed by Jane's Fighting Ships as part of the Dominican Navy as late as 1995, but had been dropped from the list by the 1999 release.

In media
 "Reunion," a 1992 episode of the PBS television series Return to the Sea, tells the story of Icarus′s sinking of U-352, includes footage of U-352′s wreck and 1992 interviews with crewmen from Icarus and U-352, and documents a memorial service for the crew of U-352 over the site of her wreck on May 9, 1992, the 50th anniversary of her sinking.

Notes

References
 Icarus, 1932 (PDF), U.S. Coast Guard Historian's Office, Accessed August 6, 2013.
 Conn, Stetson et al. [1964] (2002). Guarding the United States and Its Outposts, Seattle: University Press of the Pacific.

External links

 Pictures of USCGC Icarus and the prisoners from U-352, Uboat Archive, May 1942. Accessed August 16, 2007.
 United States Atlantic Fleet Anti-Submarine Warfare Unit, Internal memos regarding destruction of enemy submarine by USCGC Icarus, Uboat Archive, May 1942. Accessed August 16, 2007.
 Return to the Sea Episode 204 "Reunion" at OceanArchives (Fair use policy for video at OceanArchives)

Ships of the United States Coast Guard
Thetis-class patrol boats
World War II patrol vessels of the United States
Ships built in Bath, Maine
1932 ships